Thomas Linley may refer to:

Thomas Linley the elder (1733–1795), English composer and conductor
Thomas Linley the younger (1756–1778), his son, a violinist, composer and friend of Mozart